Tinnura is a comune (municipality) in the Province of Oristano in the Italian region Sardinia, located about  northwest of Cagliari and about  north of Oristano.

Tinnura borders the following municipalities: Flussio, Sagama, Suni.

Demographic evolution

References

External links

 www.comune.tinnura.nu.it/

Cities and towns in Sardinia